Back 2 Da Basics is the fifth studio album by American rapper Yo Gotti. It was released on May 23, 2006, by TVT, and was Yo Gotti's second and final studio album via TVT.

Track listing

Sample credits
"I Got Dem" contains samples of "Fireman" performed by Lil Wayne, and "I Got That Work" performed by Big Tymers.
"Gangsta Party" contains a sample of "Far Cry", which was written and performed by Marvin Gaye.

References 

2006 albums
Yo Gotti albums
Albums produced by Scott Storch
Albums produced by Drumma Boy